Ramgarh is one of the 200 Legislative Assembly constituencies of Rajasthan state in India. 
 It is in Alwar district and is a segment of Alwar (Lok Sabha constituency).

Members of Vidhan Sabha
 1951 : Durlabh Singh (INC)
 1967 : Shobha Ram Kumawat (INC)
 1972 : Shobha Ram Kumawat (INC)
 2013 : Gyandev Ahuja (BJP)

Election results

2018

2013 Vidhan Sabha
 Gyandev Ahuja (BJP) : 73,842 votes  
 Zubair Khan (INC) : 69,195

1951 Vidhan Sabha
 Durlabh Singh (INC) : 18,434 votes  
 Phool Chand (CPI) : 4,371

See also
List of constituencies of the Rajasthan Legislative Assembly
Alwar district
 Ramgarh, Dantaramgarh

References

Alwar district
Assembly constituencies of Rajasthan